Coulson is both a surname and a given name. Notable people with the name include:

Surname:
Andy Coulson (born 1968), English journalist and political strategist
Armando A. Coulson F. (born 1994), Panamanian Criminologist
Bernie Coulson (born 1965), Canadian actor
Bob Coulson (1887–1953), American baseball player
Catherine E. Coulson (1943–2015), American actress
Charles Coulson (1910–1974), British applied mathematician, theoretical chemist and religious author
Charlie Coulson (born 1996), English footballer
Christian Coulson (born 1978), English actor
Danny Coulson, American law enforcement official, Deputy Assistant Director of the FBI
D'Arcy Coulson (1908–1996), Canadian ice hockey player and hotelier
Elizabeth Coulson (born 1954), Illinois politician
Elizabeth Kerr Coulson (1819–1876), English novelist
Frederick Coulson, rugby footballer
Gustavus Hamilton Blenkinsopp Coulson VC (1879–1901), British Army officer
Ivar "Pop" Coulson, American inventor of the malted milkshake
John Coulson (1910–1990), British professor of chemical engineering
Sir John Coulson (diplomat) (1909–1997), British ambassador to Sweden and secretary-general of EFTA
John Hubert Arthur Coulson (1906–1989), English detective fiction writer under pen name John Bonnet
Joseph Coulson (born 1957), American novelist, playwright and poet
Josh Coulson (born 1989), English footballer
Juanita Coulson (born 1933), American science fiction and fantasy writer
Leslie Coulson (1889–1916), English journalist and poet
Lindsey Coulson (born 1960), British actress
Mark Coulson (born 1977), English footballer
Michael Coulson (barrister) (1927–2002), British barrister, judge and politician
Michael Coulson (footballer) (born 1988), English footballer
Sir Peter Coulson LJ, (born 1958) Appeal Court judge in England and Wales
Phil Coulson, fictional character in the Marvel Cinematic Universe
Robert Coulson (1928–1999), American science fiction writer
Robert E. Coulson (1912–1986), American lawyer and politician
Sam Coulson (born 1987), English guitarist
Violet Coulson, second wife of the first Prime Minister of Malaysia
Walter Coulson (1795–1860), English newspaper editor and barrister
William Coulson (1802–1877), English surgeon
Willie Coulson (born 1951), English footballer 

Given name:
Coulson Kernahan (1858–1943), English novelist
Coulson Norman Mitchell VC (1889–1978), Canadian military hero

Places 
Coulson, Montana, US
Coulson's Hill, Ontario, rural community in Bradford West Gwillimbury, Ontario, Canada
Coulson, Ontario, rural community in Oro-Medonte, Ontario, Canada
Coulson, Queensland, Australia

See also 
Colson
Coulsdon

English-language surnames